The Estadio Único Diego Armando Maradona (One-of-a kind Diego Armando Maradona Stadium, formerly Estadio Ciudad de La Plata) is a multi-purpose stadium located in the city of La Plata, Argentina. It is also known popularly as the Estadio Único (One-of-a kind Stadium) and is owned by Buenos Aires Province, administered jointly by the provincial government, the Municipality of La Plata, and the football clubs Estudiantes de La Plata and Gimnasia y Esgrima de la Plata.

Opened on June 7, 2003, the stadium was considered "the most modern of Latin America", even without having completed all of the planned construction. Its tenants include Estudiantes LP whose own stadium, the Estadio Jorge Luis Hirschi, was declared unsafe in 2005, and Gimnasia y Esgrima LP. Gimnasia returned to their original stadium (Estadio Juan Carmelo Zerillo) in mid-2008.

It is located between 32nd and 526th avenues, 25 Street and 21. These fields also contain a small rugby union stadium and a center for Physical Education, which tend to be intercollegiate events with schools in the area, such as the school No. 31, better known as the Saint Martin Commercial.

Besides the planned placement of the cover to the third stage, which will begin in 2009, by virtue of being made the first two stages.

History

Beginnings 

The idea of the project began in 1947 when Governor Domingo Mercante expropriated the property located at the junction of Roads 32 and 25 and formed the La Plata Sports Complex.

In 1972, La Plata was to be a candidate to host matches in the 1978 FIFA World Cup. The Government of Argentina called for project competitive bids to construct a "unique stadium" in the city. It would be built in a municipal land situated near Ringuelet train station, adding other lands to be expropriated. The government choose the project presented by Antonini-Schon-Zemborain, nevertheless it would never carried out.

In 1989, after a meeting between the Buenos Aires Province Government and the Municipality of La Plata's, Estudiantes and Gimnasia, created a committee to build and manage a complex dedicated entirely to the practice of football and other sports.

Thus, after reviewing several alternatives, the construction of the stadium was proposed to take place in the area of the Center for Physical Education No. 2. This determined as the most accessible area for a stadium in La Plata. In January 1992 it was signed into law 11118, which established the construction site.

Construction 
On April 21, 1992, the Estadio Ciudad de La Plata Foundation was established, which was an institution composed equally of representatives from Estudiantes and Gimnasia. The College of Architects and Engineers held a meeting in April 1993 to choose an architectural proposal. It was awarded to Roberto Ferreira & Associates.

In 1996 a permit was given by the Executive Branch that awarded the provincial administration the right to begin construction the following year. The Executive Unit called for public tenders for the job.

A year later they began building the supports for the roof. And in 1998, the governor Eduardo Duhalde and the Mayor of La Plata, Julio Alak, laid the first stone to begin the construction of the stadium.

The works also detained foir trade union and economic problems in 2000, so ad with Eduardo Duhalde as President of the Nation, called for a new tender for the allocation of investment with a view to its installation in May 2003.

Opening and events

The stadium opened on June 7, 2003. The stadium was temporarily closed to convert it into an all-seater stadium, and to install a new roof intended to cover all seats. Work had gone ahead of schedule and the roof was finished before the end of February. The stadium was officially reopened on February 17, 2011, and its first match was played six days later between Estudiantes and Deportes Tolima for the Group 7 of the 2011 Copa Libertadores.

The stadium has since become a significant venue for musicians on tour. Over 300,000 tickets to such events at the stadium were sold in 2011, ranking the La Plata Stadium fifth worldwide in performing events tickets sold.

After the passing of Diego Maradona in November 2020, the stadium was named "Estadio Único Diego Maradona" to honor the legend. In the same way, one of its grandstands was named "Alejandro Sabella " to honor one of the most notable players from the city.

Events

Friendly matches 
The stadium has hosted at least two friendly matches featuring the national team.

2011 Copa América 
The stadium was confirmed as one of seven venues to host the 2011 Copa América in Argentina including the opening game. La Plata ended up hosting a total of six matches.

The Rugby Championship 
The stadium has also hosted a number of rugby matches between the Argentina and the New Zealand as part of The Rugby Championship, which Argentina joined in 2012.

Panorama

Concerts

References

External links 

 
 Official website (archived, 20 Dec 2015)
 World Stadiums Article 
 Stadium Guide Article

Estadio Ciudad de La Plata
Football venues in Argentina
Estadio Ciudad de La Plata
Rugby union stadiums in Argentina
Sports venues completed in 2003
Sports venues in Buenos Aires Province
Estadio Ciudad de La Plata